The 1999 Giro d'Italia was the 82nd edition of the Giro d'Italia, one of cycling's Grand Tours. The Giro began in Agrigento, with a flat stage on 15 May, and Stage 11 occurred on 25 May with a stage to Cesenatico. The race finished in Milan on 6 June.

Stage 1
15 May 1999 — Agrigento to Modica,

Stage 2
16 May 1999 — Noto to Catania,

Stage 3
17 May 1999 — Catania to Messina,

Stage 4
18 May 1999 — Vibo Valentia to Terme Luigiane,

Stage 5
19 May 1999 — Terme Luigiane to Massiccio del Sirino,

Stage 6
20 May 1999 — Lauria to Foggia,

Stage 7
21 May 1999 — Foggia to Lanciano,

Stage 8
22 May 1999 — Pescara to Gran Sasso d'Italia,

Stage 9
23 May 1999 — Ancona to Ancona,  (ITT)

Stage 10
24 May 1999 — Ancona to Sansepolcro,

Stage 11
25 May 1999 — Sansepolcro to Cesenatico,

References

1999 Giro d'Italia
Giro d'Italia stages